The bass saxophone is one of the lowest-pitched members of the saxophone family—larger and lower than the more common baritone saxophone. It was likely the first type of saxophone built by Adolphe Sax, as first observed by Berlioz in 1842. It is a transposing instrument pitched in B, an octave below the tenor saxophone and a perfect fourth below the baritone saxophone. A bass saxophone in C, intended for orchestral use, was included in Adolphe Sax's patent, but few known examples were built. The bass saxophone is not a commonly used instrument, but it is heard on some 1920s jazz recordings, in free jazz, in saxophone choirs and sextets, and occasionally in concert bands and rock music.

Music for bass saxophone is written in treble clef, just as for the other saxophones, with the pitches sounding two octaves and a major second lower than written. As with most other members of the saxophone family, the lowest written note is the B below the staff—in the bass's case, sounding as a concert A1 . German wind instrument maker Benedikt Eppelsheim and Brazilian low saxophone maker J'Elle Steiner have both made bass saxophones with an additional key to produce low (written) A. This is similar to the low A key on the baritone saxophone, and produces a concert G1 (~ 49 Hz). Most basses made before the 1980s were keyed to high Eb, but most more recent models are keyed to high F#.

In jazz
The bass saxophone enjoyed some popularity in jazz combos and dance bands between World War I and World War II, primarily providing bass line, although bass sax players occasionally took melodic solos. Notable players of this era include Billy Fowler, Coleman Hawkins, Otto Hardwicke (of the Duke Ellington orchestra), Adrian Rollini (who was a pioneer of bass sax solos in the 1920s and 30s), Min Leibrook, Spencer Clark, Charlie Ventura, and Vern Brown of the Six Brown Brothers. Sheet music of the period shows many bands photographed with a bass sax. The bass sax virtually disappeared in the 1930s, possibly due to its size, mechanical complexity, and high price. The invention of the electric bass guitar in the 1950s and its quick rise to popularity reduced demand for other bass instruments in popular music and other contemporary music.

American bandleader Boyd Raeburn (1913–1966) led an avant-garde big band in the 1940s and sometimes played the bass saxophone. In Britain, Oscar Rabin played it in his own band. Harry Gold, a member of Rabin's band, played bass saxophone in his own band, Pieces of Eight. American bandleader Stan Kenton's "Mellophonium Orchestra" (1960–1963) featured fourteen brass players and used a saxophone section of one alto, two tenors, baritone, and bass on Johnny Richards' compositions (with Joel Kaye playing baritone and bass saxophones). That ensemble recorded several successful albums and won two Grammys. The Lawrence Welk Band featured Bill Page soloing on bass saxophone on several broadcasts during the 1960s. Shorty Rogers's Swingin' Nutcracker (recorded for RCA Victor in 1960) featured a bass saxophone (played by Bill Hood) on four of the movements.

The 1970s traditional jazz band The Memphis Nighthawks built their sound around diminutive bass saxophonist Dave Feinman. Some revivalist bass saxophonists performing today in the 1920s–1930s style are Vince Giordano and Bert Brandsma, leader of the Dixieland Crackerjacks. Jazz players using the instrument in a more contemporary style include Roscoe Mitchell, Anthony Braxton, Peter Brötzmann, J. D. Parran, Hamiet Bluiett, James Carter, Stefan Zeniuk, Michael Marcus, Vinny Golia, Joseph Jarman, Brian Landrus, Urs Leimgruber, Tony Bevan, and Scott Robinson, although none of these players use it as their primary instrument.

Jan Garbarek plays a bass sax on the 1973 album Red Lanta.

In rock
Bass saxophonists in rock include:
Angelo Moore of the American band Fishbone
Rodney Slater in the Bonzo Dog Doo-Dah Band (1960s)
Ralph Carney of the avant-garde rock band Tin Huey (1970s)
John Linnell of They Might Be Giants (formed 1982)
Dana Colley of Morphine (formed 1989)
Kurt McGettrick in Frank Zappa's band in the late 1980s
Alto Reed of Bob Seger and the Silver Bullet Band often played bass sax at live shows, in songs without a prominent sax part.
Colin Stetson has performed and recorded with Arcade Fire, Bell Orchestre, Tom Waits, TV on the Radio, Bon Iver, Feist and LCD Soundsystem. He also performs and records his own compositions.
Blaise Garza – touring member of Violent Femmes since 2004.
Kellie Everett – member of The Hooten Hallers since 2014.

In classical music
At the 1844 World's Fair in Paris, the saxophone's premier performance was a chamber piece called Chant Sacré composed by Hector Berlioz for two trumpets, one soprano saxhorn, two clarinets, and one bass saxophone; Adolphe Sax himself played the saxophone part. The same year, Georges Kastner wrote for it in his opera Le Dernier Roi de Juda.

It is rarely used in orchestral music, though several examples exist. The earliest extant orchestral work to employ it is William Henry Fry's "sacred symphony" Hagar In the Wilderness (1853), which also calls for soprano saxophone and was written for Louis-Antoine Jullien's orchestra during its American tour. Richard Strauss, in his Sinfonia Domestica, wrote four saxophone parts including one for bass saxophone in C. Arnold Schoenberg wrote for the bass saxophone in his one-act opera Von Heute auf Morgen, and Karlheinz Stockhausen includes a part for it in the saxophone section of Lucifer's Dance, the third scene of Samstag aus Licht.

In the 1950s and 1960s it enjoyed a brief vogue in orchestrations for musical theater: Leonard Bernstein’s original score for West Side Story includes bass saxophone, as does Meredith Willson’s Music Man and Sandy Wilson’s The Boy Friend.

The bass saxophone is occasionally called for in concert bands, typically in arrangements from before 1950. Australian composer Percy Grainger and American composer Warren Benson are particularly notable composers who wrote for it.

Today, bass saxophone is most commonly used to perform chamber music. It is typically featured in saxophone choirs and sextets, especially those in the direct legacy of teacher-soloist Sigurd Rascher. It is also occasionally used to perform in smaller (less than six-member) chamber groups, though typically to play a part originally intended for another instrument as very few such pieces are written to include bass sax.

References

External links

BassSax.com web site
Bass saxophone page at www.contrabass.com, the "Contrabass Mania" web site
Innovative Bass Saxophone design from Eppelsheim
Six Brown Brothers
Vince Giordano plays bass saxophone on A Prairie Home Companion radio program, 9 April 2005
MP3 excerpt of first movement of "Sonatina Giacosa" for bass saxophone and piano (1987) by Walter S. Hartley, performed by Jay Easton
Dixieland Crackerjacks - Sweet Georgia Brown bass sax feature Watch Bert Brandsma in a bass saxophone feature: Sweet Georgia Brown, recorded April 28. 2007 (YouTube)

Saxophones
Bass (sound)
B-flat instruments
Concert band instruments
1841 introductions